"Gotta Go Gotta Leave (Tired)" is a song co-written and performed by American contemporary R&B singer Vivian Green, issued as the lead single from her second studio album Vivian. On July 30, 2005, it became her second song to reach #1 on the Billboard dance chart (following her debut single "Emotional Rollercoaster").

Music video

The official music video for the song was directed by Diane Martel.

Charts

Weekly charts

Year-end charts

References

External links
 
 

2005 songs
2005 singles
Vivian Green songs
Columbia Records singles
Music videos directed by Diane Martel
Songs written by Vivian Green